Eric Gustaf Tunmarck (1 May 1729 – 1789) was a Swedish-Norwegian painter.

Biography
He was born in Gothenburg, Sweden.  His apprenticeship was with Jacob von Schönfeldt (1709–1766) in Gothenburg. He arrived in Kongsberg during 1760, bringing a certificate from the parish priest in Holmestrand. He worked with Johan Diderich von Dram  (ca 1725–1798) contributing to the interior decoration of Kongsberg Church  (Kongsberg kirke).  He also entered service with  Søren Christensen Daugaard who was awarded a contract for the church's  ceiling painting.

After this assignment, he established himself as a portrait painter and painter of church interior in Norway. Among his best known portraits is the portrait of  senior mining official (berghauptmann) Michael Heltzen who chaired the committee for the construction of Kongsberg Church.

Some of his wall decorations are preserved at the Drammen Museum of Art and Cultural History. He died in Bragernes, Norway  during 1789.

References

1729 births
1789 deaths
People from Gothenburg
Swedish portrait painters
18th-century Swedish painters
18th-century Swedish male artists
Swedish male painters
Swedish emigrants to Norway